India competed at the 2018 Commonwealth Games at Gold Coast, Australia from 4 to 15 April 2018.  It was India's 17th appearance at the Commonwealth Games. With 26 Gold medals and a total of 66 medals, India finished 3rd for the tournament. It was India's best position since the 2010 Commonwealth Games, which they hosted.

Competitors

|  style="text-align:left; width:78%; vertical-align:top;"|
The following is a list of the number of competitors representing India that participated at the Games per India/discipline:

Medalists
India was the best nation in 5 disciplines, weightlifting, shooting, wrestling, badminton and table tennis, and the second best nation in boxing.

| style="text-align:left; vertical-align:top;"|

|  style="text-align:left; vertical-align:top;"|

|

Athletics

Men
Track & road events

* Competed in heats only.

Field events

Women
Track & road events

Field events

Combined Events – Heptathlon

Badminton

India was represented by 10 athletes, 5 men and 5 women.

Singles

Doubles

Mixed team

Summary

Roster

Pranav Chopra
Srikanth Kidambi
Prannoy Kumar
Saina Nehwal
Ashwini Ponnappa
Satwiksairaj Rankireddy
N. Sikki Reddy
Chirag Shetty
Gadde Ruthvika Shivani
P V Sindhu

Pool A

Quarterfinals

Semifinals

Final

Basketball

India has qualified a men's and women's basketball teams for a total of 24 athletes (12 men and 12 women). Both teams were invited by FIBA and the CGF.

Summary

Men's tournament

Roster

Ravi Bhardwaj
Arvind Arumugam
Satnam Bhamara
Arshpreet Bhullar
Aravind Annadurai
Akilan Pari
Justin Joseph
Jeevanantham Pandi
Yadwinder Singh
Joginder Singh
Amritpal Singh
Amjyot Gill

Pool B

Women's tournament

Roster

Pool B

Boxing

India was represented by 12 athletes, 8 men and 4 women.
Men

Women

Cycling

India participated with 9 athletes (4 men and 5 women).

Track
Sprint

Keirin

Time trial

Pursuit

Points race

Scratch race

Gymnastics

India was represented by 7 athletes, 3 men and 4 women.

Artistic

Men
Team Final & Individual Qualification

Individual Finals

Women
Team Final & Individual Qualification

Individual events

Rhythmic
Women
Individual

Hockey

India has qualified a men's and a women's team for a total of 36 athletes (18 men and 18 women) based on the FIH World Rankings as of 31 October 2017.

Summary

Men's tournament

Team
Hockey India announced the team of 18 members which was led by Manpreet Singh.
Squad:
Goalkeepers: Sreejesh Parattu Raveendran, Suraj Karkera
Defenders: Rupinder Pal Singh, Harmanpreet Singh, Varun Kumar, Kothajit Singh, Gurinder Singh, Amit Rohidas
Midfielders: Manpreet Singh (C), Chinglensana Singh Kangujam (VC), Sumit, Vivek Sagar Prasad
Forwards: Akashdeep Singh, S.V. Sunil, Gurjant Singh, Mandeep Singh, Lalit Upadhyay, Dilpreet Singh
Preliminary round
Pool B

Semi-finals

Bronze medal match

Women's tournament

Hockey India has announced the team which was led by Rani Rampal.
Squad:
Goalkeepers: Savita (VC), Rajani Etimarpu
Defenders: Deepika, Sunita Lakra, Deep Grace Ekka, Gurjit Kaur,  Sushila Chanu Pukhrambam
Midfielders: Monika, Namita Toppo, Nikki Pradhan, Neha Goyal, Lilima Minz
Forwards: Rani (C), Vandana Kataria, Lalremsiami, Navjot Kaur, Navneet Kaur, Poonam Rani
Preliminary round
Pool A

Semi-finals

Bronze medal match

Lawn bowls

India was represented by 10 athletes, 5 men and 5 women.

Men

Women

Powerlifting

India participated with 4 athletes (3 men and 1 woman).

Shooting

Men

Women

Squash

Team of 6 athletes represented India at the squash competition in the 2018 Commonwealth Games.
Individual

Doubles

Swimming

Men

Women

Table tennis

India was represented by 10 athletes, 5 men and 5 women. Sharath Kamal, Sathiyan Gnanasekaran, Sanil Shetty, Harmeet Desai and Anthony Amalraj made up the men's Table Tennis squad. The women's squad comprised Manika Batra, Mouma Das, Sutirtha Mukherjee, Madhurika Patkar and Pooja Sahasrabudhe.

Singles

Doubles

Team

Para-sport

Weightlifting

Men

Women

Wrestling

India participated with 12 athletes (6 men and 6 women).

Repechage Format

Group stage Format

Nordic Format

References

2018
Commonwealth Games
Nations at the 2018 Commonwealth Games